Heiko Maile (born 12 January 1966) is a German musician and composer. He is best known as a member of the band Camouflage and as the composer for the score of the films The Wave and We Are the Night and won the Deutscher Fernsehpreis for best music in 2017.

Biography
Born in Sydney, Australia, Heiko Maile grew up in Bietigheim-Bissingen. His first musical steps were at a young age when he started taking classical guitar lessons. His career as a musician and producer began in 1983, as one of the founding members of the synthpop band Camouflage. In the 1990s, Maile founded with Marcus Meyn the music publishing company, Areu Areu. During this time, he met the music producer Mathias Willvonseder. They formed a long-term partnership, resulting in numerous commercials and films, which were often awarded prizes at festivals. He is also a member of the Composers' Collective Gutleut, where he met composer and arranger Torsten Kamps, and the two began working closely together. During this time, Maile started to develop a desire to compose for films and approached producer Christian Becker.

Maile finally began composing for films in 2006 when he did the music for a short film called Basti. Maile was then hired by Becker to create the score as well as a few original songs for the teen-thriller The Wave. The film was a hit among both critics and viewers.

Maile went on to have a good working relationship with Christian Becker and The Wave director Dennis Gansel and composed the music for We Are the Night, which was nominated for German Film Prize (the German Oscars) in 2011.

Heiko Maile now lives and works in Stuttgart.

Filmography 
 2006: Basti (shortfilm) (short)
 2008: The Wave
 2009: 
 2010: 
 2010: We Are The Night
 2010: Love & Theft (short)
 2011: 
 2012: The Fourth State
 2012: 
 2014: Nuggets (short)
 2015: Das Gewinnerlos
 2015: Abschussfahrt
 2016: Winnetou - Eine neue Welt, Winnetou & Old Shatterhand
 2016: Winnetou - Das Geheimnis vom Silbersee
 2016: Winnetou - Der letzte Kampf
 2016: Allein gegen die Zeit - Der Film, Time Heroes
 2017: Die Vierhändige, Four Hands
 2017: Luna, Luna’s Revenge
 2018: Fly Rocket Fly - Mit Macheten zu den Sternen, Fly Rocket Fly
 2019: Killerman
 2019: We Are the Wave (TV series)

References

Living people
German composers
1966 births
Musicians from Sydney
German new wave musicians
Synth-pop new wave musicians
Australian people of German descent
German people of Australian descent